The Chequamegon Point Lighthouse is a lighthouse located on Long Island, one of the Apostle Islands, in Lake Superior in Ashland County, Wisconsin, near the city of Bayfield.

The Chequamegon Point light was maintained by the keeper of the La Pointe Light (about a mile away) and its original lens came from there. A boardwalk connected them, so light keepers could ride bicycles between the lights.  It is currently owned by the National Park Service and part of the Apostle Islands National Lakeshore.

The lighthouse was moved back on to the shoreline after it was replaced by a modern D9 cylindrical tower (a "sewer pipe" with light and fog signal) constructed in 1986.

In 1868 the original was established on Long Island's western end, marking the entrance to Chequamegon Bay and with it the towns of Washburn and Ashland.

In 1896, it was replaced by a square, white steel room sitting on steel legs. The  room is topped by an octagonal lantern with a red roof.  The concept echoes that of Lake Huron's Alpena Light.  There are also skeletal towers of various other designs in the western Great Lakes.

In 1986, the Coast Guard moved the light back from the shore, where it was threatened by erosion.
Access is by walking from the dock at the La Pointe station along the beach.

References

Further reading
 Havighurst, Walter (1943) The Long Ships Passing: The Story of the Great Lakes, Macmillan Publishers.
 Merkel, James, Long Island Light, The Overlooked Light of the Apostles (March, 2000)  pp. 19-21. Lighthouse Digest.
 Oleszewski, Wes, Great Lakes Lighthouses, American and Canadian: A Comprehensive Directory/Guide to Great Lakes Lighthouses, (Gwinn, Michigan: Avery Color Studios, Inc., 1998) .
 
 Wright, Larry and Wright, Patricia, Great Lakes Lighthouses Encyclopedia Hardback (Erin: Boston Mills Press, 2006) .

External links
 
Lighthouse friends article
NPS Inventory of Historic Light Stations - Wisconsin

 - Current D9 light is listed
Wobser, David, Chequamegon Point Light, from an article that originally appeared in Great Laker Magazine at boatnerd.com.

Lighthouses completed in 1896
Lighthouses in Ashland County, Wisconsin
Apostle Islands National Lakeshore